Laurent de Brunhoff (born 30 August 1925) is a French author and illustrator, known primarily for continuing the Babar the Elephant series of children's books that was created by his father, Jean de Brunhoff.

Early life
Brunhoff was born in Paris. The children's classic Babar began as a bedtime story that Cécile de Brunhoff told her young sons, Laurent and Mathieu, in 1930, when they were five and four years old, respectively. They loved the story about the little elephant so much that they asked their father,  who was an artist, to draw pictures for them of the elephant world their mother had described. He did and eventually created a book, L'Histoire de Babar: le petit éléphant (The Story of Babar), which was published by Jardin des Modes, a family-run publishing house. Jean de Brunhoff created five more Babar books and had one more son, Thierry, a concert pianist known particularly for his interpretation of Chopin, who became a Benedictine monk in 1974.

Career
After the war, Laurent, who inherited his father's artistic gift, trained at the Académie de la Grande Chaumière under the painter Othon Friesz and began living as an artist in Montparnasse. But, wishing to maintain his tie to his father and the imaginative world of his childhood, he turned back to the character his father had drawn and taught himself to draw in his father's style. What Christine Nelson calls their "intergenerational artistic partnership" had begun even earlier, when Laurent was a teenager, and was asked to do the color for several pages that his father had left in black and white. His own first Babar book, Babar et ce coquin d’Arthur (Babar’s Cousin, That Rascal Arthur), was published in 1946 when Laurent was 21.

He went on to publish over forty-five more Babar books, as well as creating children's books with characters of his own invention, Bonhomme and Serafina, among others.

Personal life
He was married to Marie-Claude Bloch in 1951 and together they had two children, Anne, born 1952, and Antoine, born 1954. They separated in 1985 and divorced in 1990.

In 1985 de Brunhoff moved to the United States, living in Middletown, Connecticut, with writer and Wesleyan University professor Phyllis Rose. They married in 1990  and currently live in New York and Key West, Florida.

Honors
De Brunhoff, who holds both French and American citizenship, was made an Officier de l’Ordre des Arts et des Lettres, and a Chevalier of the Légion d’Honneur by the government of France.

Exhibitions
There have been major exhibitions of his work and his father's work in 1981 at the Centre Culturel du Marais in Paris, in 1983-84 in the United States (Minneapolis Institute of the Arts, Baltimore Museum of Art, Toledo Museum of Art, among others), in 1987 in Japan, and in 1989-90 at the National Academy of Design in New York and the Royal Ontario Museum in Toronto, among others.

In 2008, the Morgan Library and Museum in New York mounted a major exhibition of original drawings and manuscripts by Jean and Laurent de Brunhoff, for which a catalogue was published, Drawing Babar: Early Drafts and Watercolors by Christine Nelson that included an essay about Babar by Adam Gopnik, which was also published in The New Yorker. It celebrated the gift to the Morgan by Laurent de Brunhoff and his brothers, Mathieu and Thierry, of the manuscript of Jean de Brunhoff's first book, Histoire de Babar (The Story of Babar, 1931)  and by Laurent of the manuscript of his first book, Babar et ce coquin d'Arthur (Babar's Cousin: That Rascal Arthur, 1946). 

There have been smaller shows at many museums throughout the United States, including the Art Institute of Chicago, the Dixon Gallery in Memphis, the Speed Museum in Atlanta, and the Davison Center of Wesleyan University in Connecticut. 

A show was scheduled for 2011-2012 at the Musée des Arts Decoratifs in Paris. In addition, de Brunhoff has exhibited frequently at the Mary Ryan Gallery in New York, which represents his and his father's work. The work of Jean and Laurent de Brunhoff has also been the subject of books by Anne Hildebrand, Jean and Laurent de Brunhoff: The Legacy of Babar (New York: Twayne, 1991) and by Nicholas Fox Weber, The Art of Babar (New York: Harry N. Abrams, 1989).

Bibliography 
 Babar's Cousin: That Rascal Arthur. New York: Random House, 1948. (Babar et ce coquin d'Arthur. Paris: 1946)
 Babar's Picnic. New York: Random House, 1949.
 Babar's Visit to Bird Island. New York: Random House, 1952.
 Babar's Fair. New York: Random House, 1955.
 A tue-tete. Paris: Juillard, 1957.
 Babar and the Professor. New York: Random House, 1957.
 Serafina the Giraffe. Cleveland: World Publishing Co., 1961.
 Serafina's Lucky Find. Cleveland: World Publishing Co., 1962.
 Babar's Castle. New York: Random House, 1962.
 Captain Serafina. Cleveland: World Publishing Co., 1963.
 Anatole and His Donkey. New York: Macmillan, 1963.
 Babar's French Lessons. New York: Random House, 1963.
 Babar Comes to America. New York: Random House, 1965.
 Babar's Spanish Lessons. New York: Random House, 1965.
 Bonhomme. New York: Pantheon, 1965.
 Babar Learns to Cook. New York: Random House, 1967.
 Babar Loses His Crown. New York: Random House, 1967.
 Babar's Games. New York: Random House, 1968.
 Babar's Moon Trip. New York: Random House, 1969.
 Babar's Trunk. New York: Random House, 1969.
 Babar's Birthday Surprise. New York: Random House, 1970
 Gregory and the Lady Turtle in the Valley of the Music Trees. New York: Pantheon, 1971.
 Babar's Other Trunk. New York: Random House, 1971.
 Babar Visits Another Planet. New York: Random House, 1972.
 Meet Babar and His Family. New York: Random House, 1973.
 Babar's Bookmobile. New York: Random House, 1974.
 Bonhomme and the Huge Beast. New York: Pantheon, 1974.
 Babar and the Wully-Wully. New York: Random House, 1975. (Babar et le Wouly-Wouly. Paris: Hachette)
 Babar Saves the Day. New York: Random House, 1976.
 Babar's Mystery. New York: Random House, 1978. (Babar et les quatre voleurs. Paris: Hachette)
 The One Pig with Horns. New York: Pantheon, 1979.
 Babar the Magician. New York: Random House, 1980.
 Babar's Little Library. New York: Random House, 1980
 Babar and the Ghost. New York: Random House, 1981. (Babar et le fantôme. Paris: Hachette)
 Babar's Anniversary Album. New York: Random House, 1981.
 Babar's A.B.C. New York: Random House, 1983.
 Babar's Book of Color. New YOrk: Random House, 1984.
 Babar's Counting Book. New York: Random House, 1986.
 Babar's Little Girl. New York: Random House, 1987. (Babar et sa fille Isabelle. Paris: Hachette)
 "Christmas with Babar & Baby Isabelle." Woman's Day, 22 December 1987.
 Babar's Adventures, Calendar for 1988. New York: Stewart, Tabori & Chang, 1988.
 Babar's Little Circus Star. New York: Random House, 1988.
 Babar in Hollywood, Calendar for 1990. New York: Stewart, Tabori & Chang, 1989.
 Babar's Busy Year. New York: Random House, 1989.
 Babar in History, Calendar for 1991. New York: Stewart, Tabori & Chang, 1990.
 Isabelle's New Friend. New York: Random House, 1990.
 Babar's Battle. New York: Random House, 1992. (La victoire de Babar. Paris: Hachette)
 Babar's Rescue. New York: Random House, 1993. (Babar et la cité perdue. Paris: Hachette)
 Babar and the Succotash Bird. New York: Harry N. Abrams, Inc., 2000. (Babar et l'oiseau magicien. Paris: Hachette)
 Babar's Yoga for Elephants. New York: Harry N. Abrams, 2002. (Babar: le yoga des éléphants. Paris: Hacette)
 Babar's Museum of Art. New York, Harry N. Abrams, 2003. (Le musée de Babar. Paris: Hachette)
 Babar's World Tour. New York: Harry N. Abrams, 2005. (Le tour du monde de Babar. Paris: Hachette)
 Babar's USA. New York: Harry N. Abrams, 2008.
 Babar's Celesteville Games. New York: Harry N. Abrams, 2011.
 Babar and His Family (An adaptation of Meet Babar and His Family. 1973). New York: Harry N. Abrams, 2012.
 B Is for Babar: An Alphabet Book (An adaptation of Babar's A.B.C.. 1983). New York: Harry N. Abrams, 2012.
 Babar and the New Baby (An adaptation of Babar's Little Girl. 1987). New York: Harry N. Abrams, 2013.
 Babar's Guide to Paris. New York: Harry N. Abrams, 2017.

References 

Jean and Laurent de Brunhoff, Babar's Anniversary Album, with an introduction by Maurice Sendak and family photos and autobiographical captions by Laurent. New York: Random House, 1981.

External links
Lambiek Comiclopedia article.
 Meet Jean and Laurent de Brunhoff Retrieved 2011-05-27.

1925 births
Living people
Artists from Paris
French illustrators
French children's book illustrators
French emigrants to the United States
French animators
Alumni of the Académie de la Grande Chaumière
Babar the Elephant